The 2022 St. Thomas Tommies football team represented the University of St. Thomas in Saint Paul, Minnesota as a member of the Pioneer Football League (PFL) during the 2022 NCAA Division I FCS football season. Led by 14th-year head coach Glenn Caruso, the Tommies compiled an overall record of 10–1 with a mark of 8–0 in conference play, winning the PFL title. St. Thomas was ineligible for the NCAA Division I Football Championship playoffs due to the program's transition from NCAA Division III. Davidson received the PFL's automatic bid to the playoffs. The Tommies played home games at O'Shaughnessy Stadium in Saint Paul, Minnesota.

Previous season

The Tommies finished the 2021 season with a record 7–3, 6–2 in PFL play to finish in a tie for third place.

Schedule

Game summaries

at Southern Utah

Michigan Tech

Lincoln (CA)

at Marist

Davidson

Drake

at Presbyterian

San Diego

at Valparaiso

Stetson

at Butler

References

St. Thomas
St. Thomas (Minnesota) Tommies football seasons
Pioneer Football League champion seasons
St. Thomas Tommies football